Highway 254 (AR 254, Ark. 254, and Hwy. 254) is an east–west state highway in Van Buren County and Searcy County. The route of  runs from Highway 27 east to US Route 65 (US 65) at Dennard.

Route description

Highway 254 begins at Highway 27 in rural parts of northwestern Van Buren County. The route winds north through hills and farmland to enter Searcy County, then heads east to re-enter Van Buren County. The route terminates at US 65 at Dennard. The route does not cross any other state highways.

History
The route first appears on the state highway map in January 1959 as a  unpaved road shooting west from Dennard. The road was later extended east through Booster and south to Highway 16 in 1967. Highway 254 was rerouted along the current alignment around 1981.

Major intersections

See also

References

254
Transportation in Van Buren County, Arkansas
Transportation in Searcy County, Arkansas